This is a list of international trips made by Antonis Samaras, as Prime Minister of Greece, from 20 June 2012 to 26 January 2015.

Summary of international trips

2012

2013

2014

2015

References 

Lists of 21st-century trips
21st century in international relations
Samaras
International prime ministerial trips made by Antonis Samaras
Diplomatic visits by heads of government